Chameleon in a Candy Store (originally titled Chameleon on a Kaleidoscope) is a 2012 Dutch novel written by Anonymous.

Summary 
Chameleon in a Candy Store picks up where Diary of an Oxygen Thief left off. The narrator is now in an exclusive relationship with the French girl mentioned at the end of the previous book. At her insistence, he begins seeing a therapist. It looks like he might be about to settle down and get married until the very act of going to therapy opens him up to other options. When he discovers online dating he begins to realize that selling products is not that much different from seducing girls and so he harnesses his advertising skills to do exactly that. After breaking up with the French girl and ending the therapy sessions he embarks on a sexual adventure encountering all manner of women online. As he continues to date these women the need to promote his book becomes more and more urgent until he starts to combine online-dating with book promotion. This culminates in him creating a fictional dating profile of a beautiful girl who cites Diary Of An Oxygen Thief as her favorite book. Book sales soar since men will do anything to get a date with this fictional beauty. We are left with the feeling that the narrator will create all sorts of "covertising" and that we should henceforth be wary in all our online dealings.

References 

2014 novels
Self-published books
English-language novels
Works published anonymously